Asaad Ali Yaseen (born 3 February 1953), is an Iraqi former politician and a businessman,  he was the Iraqi ambassador to Sofia, Bulgaria, appointed by the Iraqi Ministry of Foreign Affairs in 2009, former ambassador of Iraq to Yemen 2010-2012 and was the president of Samarra’s city council from 2006 till 2007, was an officer in the Ministry of Trade from 1971 to 1980, also a leading contractor for many projects in Iraq from 1981 to 1986. Mr. Yaseen has six children; Bakir, Omar, Maimona, Dhulfiqar, Muhammad and Othman respectively.

Early life and business career
Asaad Ali Yaseen Was Born in Samarra/Salah Addin in 1953, joined the Military during the Iran-Iraq War. He earned his Bachelor of Science in Islamic and Arabic Language Faculty of Arts, from the University of Baghdad in 1978. He earned his Master in Economics from Punjab in 1996. He is a member of The Arab Academy for Banking and Financial Sciences in Amman, Jordan in 1996.

In the early 1990s, Mr. Yaseen was the chairman of one of the biggest tires trading companies "Al-Rafidain".

Besides success in business, Mr. Yaseen is known in Salah Ad din province for his charity, He built charity school in Samarra, and built water piping for an entire neighborhood on his own expense, not to mention other donations for public utilities.

In office  
Yaseen was elected as the president of the Sammarra city council in the period of September 2005 till April 2008 in a very hard period where the city witnessed an incident in February 2006 of the explosions of Shia holy shrine that caused a sea of blood in a sectarian war, at that time there were no forces in the city to stop the terrorists, Mr. Yaseen gathered men from his tribe and formed a force that he financed personally.  He lost 23 lives from his relatives and tribe including his elder brother, following a series of assassination attempts. One such incident resulted in his house, one of the biggest in the country, to be destroyed.

Yaseen was assigned as an Ambassador of Iraq to Yemen in 2010, introducing new passport services and opening of direct airline flights from Sanaa to Baghdad.

In 2013, he was assigned as Ambassador to Bulgaria where he became the Dean of the Arab diplomatic corps from December 2013 till December 2014.

In 2015, he was assigned as Ambassador to Mauritania where he stayed for one year before he retired in March 2016 due to reaching the retirement age.

Mr. Yaseen was independent and didn't join any political party in the Iraqi government.

References 
https://web.archive.org/web/20110722065548/http://www.mofa.gov.iq/eng/Theministry/amt.aspx?sm=3 
http://www.nationalreview.com/articles/225242/appointment-samarra/pete-hegseth 
http://rosettasister.wordpress.com/2008/08/06/%E2%80%9Can-appointment-in-samarra%E2%80%9D-asaad-ali-yaseen/
https://web.archive.org/web/20131219051023/http://www.mofamission.gov.iq/bgr/en/articles.aspx 

Living people
1953 births
Ambassadors of Iraq to Vietnam
Ambassadors of Iraq to Yemen